DuBeau Glacier is a channel glacier flowing to the Antarctic coast 18 nautical miles (33 km) west of Merritt Island. It was mapped in 1955 by G.D. Blodgett from air photos taken by U.S. Navy Operation Highjump in 1947, and was named by the Advisory Committee on Antarctic Names for Earl P. DuBeau, a photo interpreter with U.S. Navy Operation Windmill (1947–48), who assisted in establishing astronomical control stations along Queen Mary Coast, Knox Coast and Budd Coast.

See also
 List of glaciers in the Antarctic
 Glaciology

References 

 

Glaciers of Wilkes Land